Osim or OSIM may refer to:

Amar Osim (born 1967), Bosnian football manager and son of Ivica
Bob Osim (born 1980), Nigerian footballer
Ivica Osim (1941–2022), Bosnian football manager and father of Amar
Orenburg State Institute of Management, Russia
Osim International, a Singapore-based electrical and household appliance company

See also
Usim (disambiguation)